Raja Sir Tanjore Madhava Rao, KCSI (20 November 18284 April 1891), also known as Sir Madhava Rao Thanjavurkar or simply as Madhavarao Tanjorkar, was an Indian statesman, civil servant, administrator and politician who served as the Diwan of Travancore from 1857 to 1872, Indore from 1873 to 1875 and Baroda from 1875 to 1882. He was the nephew of the former Diwan of Travancore T. Venkata Rao and the son of T. Ranga Rao who was also the former Diwan of Travancore .

Madhava Rao was born in a prominent Deshastha Brahmin family of Kumbakonam in 1828 and had his education in Madras. After serving for two years in the Madras civil service, Madhava Rao was appointed tutor to the princes of Travancore. Impressed with his performance, Madhava Rao was transferred to the Revenue Department in which he rose step by step to become Diwan in 1857.

Madhava Rao served as Diwan of Travancore from 1857 to 1872 bringing about developments in education, legislation, public works, medicine, vaccination and public health and agriculture. He was also responsible for clearing Travancore's public debts. Madhava Rao quit as Diwan of Travancore and returned to Madras in 1872. He served as Diwan of Indore from 1873 to 1875 and as Diwan of Baroda from 1875 to 1882. In his later life, Madhava Rao actively participated in politics and was one of the early pioneers of the Indian National Congress. Madhava Rao died in 1891 in Mylapore, Madras at the age of 63.

Madhava Rao was respected and regarded for his administrative abilities. British Liberal statesman Henry Fawcett called him "the Turgot of India". In 1866, he was made a Knight Commander of the Order of the Star of India.

Early life and career
Madhava Rao was born on 20 November 1828 in a prominent Thanjavur Marathi Deshastha Brahmin family. His great-grandfather Gopal Pant and his grandfather, Gundo Pant, held offices of trust and power under the British as also various Indian princes. His father R. Ranga Rao served as the Diwan of Travancore from 18371838 and his paternal uncle Rai Raya Rai Venkata Rao was also a former Dewan of Travancore. Madhava Rao had two older brothers. His family was deeply attached to the Uttaradi Math.

Madhava Rao spent his early life in Madras city where he studied at the Government High School (later Presidency College, Madras). As a student, Madhava Rao was diligent and careful and strong in mathematics and science.  In 1846, he received his Proficient's Degree with high honours. Soon afterwards, Powell appointed him tutor of Mathematics and Physics at the High School. However, Madhava Rao quit in a short while to take up a job in the office of the Accountant General. In 1848, he was appointed tutor to the princes of Travancore at the recommendation of the English Resident which he accepted. Madhava worked for four years as tutor to the Travancore princes. Impressed with his performance, he was offered a position in the Revenue Department of Travancore. In a short time, Madhava Rao rose to be Diwan Peishkar of the Southern division. One of his contributions as the Diwan Peishkar was the expansion of the rivulet which joins the Meenanthara and Koodo rivers. He also removed fraud from the transport of salt from Nanjinaud to Trivandrum and dacoits from the area.

During this time, Travancore was facing a severe financial crisis and the treasury was empty. A large amount of subsidy due to the Madras government remained unpaid. Not long after promulgating his infamous Doctrine of Lapse, Lord Dalhousie was looking forward to annexe Travancore too under this pretext. At this juncture, the Raja of Travancore Uthram Thirunal chose Madhava Rao to negotiate a deal with the British government which he did successfully. As a result, Madhava Rao was appointed the next Diwan of Travancore in 1857.

Dewan of Travancore

At that time the entire administration of the state was in a disorganised state, public treasuries were empty and large arrears of payments in way of salaries and otherwise were pending. The Maharajah had already taken a loan from the Sri Padmanabhaswamy Temple of Trivandrum and adding the subsidy to be paid to the British Government, the state of affairs was bad enough to deter anyone from taking up the post of Dewan. Soon after Madhava Rao's appointment, the Shanar agitations took place in Travancore which added to the problems of the state.

In 1860 however, the orthodox Maharajah died and Madhava Rao's own pupil, the late Maharajah's nephew, Ayilyam Thirunal succeeded. Under the new and relatively less orthodox Maharajah, Madhava Rao's administration started its progress. Monopolies, numerous petty taxes and cessations were abolished and land tax was reduced. By 1863 the debts of the Travancore Government were cleared and the Dewan proudly declared that "Travancore has no public debt now". Salaries of public servants were raised by more than 50 percent and its morale and efficiency was improved. Madhava Rao's progressive financial measures were testified by the fact that when he assumed the office of Dewan he had an indebted and empty treasury whereas when he left the state in 1872 the state had a reserve fund of forty lakhs of rupees, a great amount in those days.

While Madhava Rao is described essentially as a financier, he also brought a great deal of development in education, legislation, public works, medicine, vaccination and public health, agriculture etc. In education, he added a study of philosophy and international law and showed a taste for art and pictures. Despite his devotion to his own traditions, he
advocated female education and social reform. Year after year his work was commended by the Madras Government. He also drew up State papers on special subjects such as Boundary disputes, trade reports and so on and started maintaining records of every department. In recognition of his services, by public subscription, a bronze statue of Madhava Rao was erected in Travancore.

The coffee cultivation in Travancore got a major boost under his administration. He started the policy of Pandarapatta Vilambaram. Under this policy, the land belonging to the government was leased to the farmers at a very low price for cultivation. This policy of leasing land had a huge impact on the people as lots of young people left farming and decided to get modern education. He also reduced the rate of export and import duties to relieve the trade.

However, due to misunderstandings which arose between the Dewan and the Maharajah, Madhava Rao retired in February 1872. The Maharajah, however, respected his work and granted him a pension of Rs. 1000, a princely amount in those days. His initial plan was to retire to Madras but instead there was great demand for his services among the Princes of India, because of his having secured for Travancore the appellation of "Model State of India" by the British Government. Henry Fawcett described, on hearing of his retirement in 1872, Madhava Rao as:

Madhava Rao was instrumental in recognising and employing Chattampi Swamikal at the Trivandrum secretariat.

Indore and Baroda

In 1872, at the request of Tukojirao Holkar II of Indore, the Government of India persuaded Madhava Rao out of his retirement to take charge as the Diwan of Indore. Madhava Rao served as Diwan from 1873 to 1875, during which he commenced the drafting of the Indian Penal Code and wrote minutes on the opium question and the extension of railways in Indore. Shortly afterwards, the Government of India requested Madhava Rao to take over as Diwan-Regent of Baroda whose ruler Malhar Rao Gaekwad had been deposed for mal-administration.

Madhava Rao reformed the revenue administration of Baroda and curbed the power of revenue officials called Sirdars. The land rights of the Sirdars were cancelled and their lands were annexed by the state. During his tenure as Diwan-Regent, Madhava Rao also effectively re-organized the army, schools, courts of law and libraries. He also introduced a lot of town-planning measures.

Madhava Rao resigned in September 1882 due to disagreements with the new Maharaja Maharaja Sayajirao Gaekwad III. He retired to his home in Mylapore on pension.

Struggle for first Constitution of an Indian Princely State

Many British civil servants in India who held positions within Indian princely states were disgusted by the total arbitrary power and laws of the Maharajas and Nawabs. In 1872, the retired Chief Commissioner of Mysore, Lewin Bentham Bowring had written in his memoir, Eastern Experience, that those  Rao included this in his writing to the Viceroy, Francis Napier in March 1872, about the need for the implementation of a written constitution in princely states requesting “a system of fundamental principles, derived from the advanced political wisdom of Europe” while “carefully adapted to the conditions of the Native society” for the princely states.

Sir Madhav Rao drafted a model constitution for princely states of India in 1874 based on the principles of separation of power of the state and sent it to Lord Napier, Viceroy of India.

His proposal was then forwarded by Lord Francis Napier to his successor, Viceroy, Lord Northbrook who dismissed it completely. Lord Northbrook fearing rebellion by princely states decided not to support proposals which could cause deep anguish among Indian princely states as countries like Russia, Germany and France were already trying to ally themselves with the princely states of India.

The princely state of Vadodara had faced many tumultuous years under Maharajah Malhar Rao Gaekwad. There had been multiple instances of gross violations of public order and private rights under the Gaekwad. The Gaekwad was involved in abducting married women and making them his slave or laundis in his palace. His tax collectors or vahivatadars were also given free hand to extort as much money from the ryots or tenants. He also implemented an exploitive and arbitrary system of nazranas or tributes on people.

Eventually, the entire situation started to unravel as the new British resident, Robert Phayre, came to Vadodara in 1873 who started to report back to the Viceroy, Lord Northbrook, about the situation in Vadodara. Lord Northbrook who did not want to upset the loyal princely states of India after the harrowing experience of revolt of 1857 decided to ignore the plea by Robert Phayre to remove the Maharajah. The British had already promised under Queen's Declaration of 1858 that they will restrain from occupying the loyal princely states.

Instead, the British formed a commission under Richard John Meade to look into the matter. The commission then recommended to the anguish of British that the Bombay should take the control of Vadodara. But, Bombay Legislative Council again rejected it vehemently with two of its members dissenting with the decision of the council -  Henry Tucker, a judge at Bombay High Court and Alexander Rogers, a noted civil servant. According to Henry Tucker, the Calcutta must force “the Maharaja to give his subjects a written Constitution”. While Alexander Rogers said that “he had been shown the draft of a Constitution drawn up by an eminent Native Statesman (Sir Madhav Rao) of great experience” which he believed will work in India if some changes are made according to the Indian context.

Seemingly under pressure from Calcutta, the Gaekwad then decided to appoint Dadabhai Naoroji as the Dewan of Vadodara in 1873. But Dadabhai Naoroji was never able to control the situation as he was constantly undercut by the fellow durbaris who did not want any change in situation. So, he decided to resign and even, the Gaekwad was disposed as there were rumors about a conspiracy hatched by the Gaekwad to poison the British resident, Robert Phayre.(The Baroda Crisis)

Lord Northbrook then unwillingly appointed Sir Madhav Rao as the next dewan of Vadodara. But, Lord Northbrook also gave strict instructions to Sir Madhav Rao to restrict himself to administrative and economic reforms only.

Sir Madhav Rao tried to implement the political reforms he always wanted to implement at the end of his tenure with Lord Northbrook's successor, Lord Ripon. But, Lord Rippon also backtracked from the reforms when he faced strong opposition from the new Maharaja of Vadodra, Sayajirao Gaekwad. Sayajirao Gaekwad made it clear to the British authorities that he will not compromise with his royal authorities.

There were also strong opposition from other quarters against the proposal of reducing the total authority given to the Maharajas in the princely states. For conservatives, the total authority of Maharaja was culturally and politically imperative for the Indian states. Amrita Bazaar Patrika wrote articles against the proposal of Madhav Rao of giving a constitution to the state of Vadodara by claiming that subjects of Indian states

Indian National Congress

Madhava Rao involved himself in politics in the later years of his life. He joined the Indian National Congress in 1887, two years after its formation. He served as the President of the Reception Committee during the 1887 Madras session. In 1888, he was offered a seat in the Imperial Legislative Council by the then Viceroy of India Lord Dufferin but Madhava Rao declined the offer on ground of health.

While delivering the inaugural address during the 1887 session, Madhava Rao described the Indian National Congress as

However, at the same time, he warned that

On June 2, 1883, he wrote the article – “Native Political Development” in Times of India.

Madhava Rao resigned from the Standing Committee in 1889 due to differences with other members over the resolution passed on reformed legislative councils.

In an article written after his death in Times of India on April 13, 1891, the article talks about his position regarding Congress.

Later life

In his later years, Madhava Rao strove to reform the educational system. Even while serving as Diwan of Baroda, Rao was made a fellow of the Madras University. He campaigned in support of women's education and attacked child marriage. He also criticised the literal interpretation of Hindu shastras. However, Madhava Rao was, till the end, a pacifist and was moderate and unreactionary in his views on social reforms.

In 1885, at the request of the then Governor of Madras, Mountstuart Elphinstone Grant-Duff, Madhava Rao presided over the Malabar Land Tenure Commission. In 1887, he presided over the convocation of the Madras University. In December 1887, Madhava Rao presided over the inaugural session of Indian National Social Conference.

Madhava Rao took a liking for British sociologist and political theorist Herbert Spencer and spent the last days of his life studying his works. He contributed articles to newspapers on a variety of topics ranging from politics and religion to astronomy. Under the pseudonyms "Native Thinker" and "Native Observer", Madhava Rao wrote opinion pieces on the German occupation of Africa and on the dress code to adopted by Hindu women in public. He forwarded his article on the German occupation of Africa to the German chancellor Bismarck who replied with a letter of acknowledgement and appreciation. In 1889, he published a pamphlet titled "Hints on the training of native children by a native Thinker" which was translated into various Indian languages as Gujarati, Marathi and Malayalam. He also composed a few small poems in Tamil.

Towards the end of his life, Madhava Rao was affected by health problems. On 22 December 1890, he suffered a stroke at his Mylapore home. Madhava Rao died three months later, on 4 April 1891 at the age of sixty-three.

Family
T. Madhava Rao married Yamuna Bai. The couple had five children, three son's, T. Ananda Rao, Ranga Rao, Ramchandra Rao; two daughters, Balubai and Ambabai. T. Ananda Rao, the eldest son of Madhava Rao, served as the Diwan of Mysore from 1909 to 1912. Madhava Rao's cousin R. Raghunatha Rao, served as the Diwan of Baroda and was also an early leader of the Indian National Congress. Another cousin of his, T. Rama Rao was the Diwan of Travancore from 1887 to 1892. T. Ananda Rao was married to Rama Rao's daughter Soundara Bai.

Titles and awards
 Fellow of the Madras University- 1862
Knight Commander of the Star of India- 1866
 Title of Rajah- 1868

Books
Books written on T. Madhava Rao and his Administration:
Raja Sir T. Madhava Rao: A Brief Sketch and Review of His Eventful Life and Career as the Administrator of the Three Leading Native States in India, Tanvancore, Indore and Baroda, G.S. Maniya & Company, 1915
Raja Sir T. Madhava Rao and the Modernization of Travancore Administration, P. Abraham Koshy, University of Kerala, 1977
Diwan Sir Thanjavur Madhava Row:Life and Times of Statesman, Administrator Extraordinaire, Bharatiya Vidya Bhavan, 2015, Urmila Rau Lal 

Books written by T. Madhava Rao:
Minor Hints; Lectures Delivered to H. H. the Maharaja Gaekwar, Sayaji Rao III, Hardpress Publishing, 2012,

References

Bibliography

External links

Travancore State Manual by V. Nagam Aiya, Vol II, pages 559–568
 
 
 
 

1828 births
Knights Commander of the Order of the Star of India
Indian knights
Diwans of Travancore
Indian Hindus
1891 deaths
People from Thanjavur district
Diwans of Baroda